Events from the year 1820 in the United States.

Incumbents

Federal Government 
 President: James Monroe (DR-Virginia)
 Vice President: Daniel D. Tompkins (DR-New York)
 Chief Justice: John Marshall (Virginia) 
 Speaker of the House of Representatives: Henry Clay (DR-Kentucky) (until October 28), John W. Taylor (DR-New York) (starting November 15)
 Congress: 16th

Events
 February 6 – 86 free African American colonists sail from New York City to Freetown, Sierra Leone.
 March 3 & 6 – Slavery in the United States: The Missouri Compromise becomes law.
 March 15 – Maine is admitted as the 23rd U.S. state (see History of Maine).
 April 24 – The Land Act of 1820 reduces the price of land in the Northwest Territory and Missouri Territory encouraging Americans to settle in the west.
 August 7 – The 1820 United States Census is conducted, eventually determining a population of 11,176,475.
 December 3 – U.S. presidential election, 1820: James Monroe is re-elected, virtually unopposed.

Undated
 Mount Rainier erupts over what is today Seattle.
 Indiana University is founded as the Indiana State Seminary and renamed the Indiana College in 1846, to later be renamed Indiana University.
 Charlottesville Woolen Mills built along the Rivanna River

Ongoing
 Era of Good Feelings (1817–1825)

Births
 February 1 – George Hendric Houghton, Episcopal clergyman (died 1897)
 February 4 – David C. Broderick, U.S. Senator from California from 1857 to 1859 (died 1859)
 February 6 
 Henry Howard Brownell, poet and historian (died 1872)
 Thomas C. Durant, American railroad financier (died 1885)
 February 8 – William Tecumseh Sherman, Civil War general (died 1891)
 February 15 – Susan B. Anthony, suffragist (died 1906)
 March 1 – George Davis, Confederate States Senator from North Carolina, 4th and last Confederate States Attorney General (died 1896)
 March 3 – Henry D. Cogswell, temperance campaigner and philanthropist (died 1900)
 March 17 – William F. Raynolds, military engineer (died 1894)
 March 24
 Fanny Crosby, mission worker and hymnist (died 1915)
 George G. Wright, U.S. Senator from Iowa from 1871 to 1877 (died 1896)
 April 8 – John Taylor Johnston, businessman and patron of the arts (died 1893)
 April 17 – Alexander Cartwright, baseball pioneer (died 1892 in Hawaii)
 April 26 – Alice Cary, poet and short story writer, sister to Phoebe Cary (died 1871)
 May 23 – Lorenzo Sawyer, 9th Chief Justice of the Supreme Court of California (died 1891)
 May 30 – Edward Doane, Protestant missionary (died 1890)
 June 2 – Willard Saulsbury, Sr., U.S. Senator from Delaware from 1859 to 1871 (died 1892)
 July 5 – Luke Pryor, U.S. Senator from Alabama in 1880 (died 1900)
 July 23 – Julia Gardiner Tyler, First Lady of the United States (died 1889)
 July 31 – John W. Garrett, banker, railroad president and philanthropist (died 1884)
 August 26 – James Harlan, U.S. Senator from Iowa from 1865 to 1866 (died 1899)
 August 30 – George Frederick Root, songwriter (died 1895)
 September 2 – Lucretia Peabody Hale, journalist and author (died 1900)
 September 3 – George Hearst, U.S. Senator from California from 1887 to 1891 (died 1891)
 September 20 – John F. Reynolds, U.S. Army general (killed 1863)
 October 5 – David Wilber, politician (died 1890)
 October 28 – John Henry Hopkins, Jr., Episcopal clergyman and hymnist (died 1891)
 November 13 – Eugene Casserly, U.S. Senator from California from 1869 to 1873 (died 1883)
 December 12 – James L. Pugh, U.S. Senator from Alabama from 1880 to 1897 (died 1907)
 December 19 – Mary Livermore, born Mary Ashton Rice, journalist, abolitionist and women's rights advocate (died 1905)
 December 21 – William H. Osborn, railroad president and philanthropist (died 1894)
 December 29 – John S. Barbour, Jr., U.S. Senator from Virginia from 1889 to 1892 (died 1892)
 Eagle Woman, Lakota leader (died 1888)

Deaths
 February 5 – William Ellery, signer of the United States Declaration of Independence, Chief Justice of the Rhode Island Supreme Court (born 1729)
 March 11 – Benjamin West, American-born painter of historical scenes (born 1738)  
 March 22 – Stephen Decatur, U.S. Navy commander (born 1779)
 April 14 – Levi Lincoln Sr., statesman from Massachusetts (born 1749)
 April 20 – James Morris III, Continental Army officer from Connecticut (born 1752)
 July 10 – William Wyatt Bibb, U.S. Senator from Georgia from 1813 to 1816, 1st Governor of Alabama (born 1781)
 August 12 – Manuel Lisa, fur trader (born 1772)
 September 3 – Benjamin Henry Latrobe, architect (born 1764 in Great Britain)
 September 21 – Joseph Rodman Drake, poet (born 1795; consumption)
 September 26 – Daniel Boone, pioneer (born 1734)
 September 29 – Barthelemy Lafon, Creole architect, engineer, city planner, surveyor and smuggler (born 1769 in France)
 October 4 – Thomas Hope, architect (born 1757 in Great Britain)
 November 8 – Lavinia Stoddard, poet and educationalist (born 1787)

See also
Timeline of United States history (1820–1859)

References

Further reading

External links
 

 
1820s in the United States
United States
United States
Years of the 19th century in the United States